Brent Raymer (born December 23, 1985) is an American former stock car racing driver.

Camping World Truck Series
Raymer made his debut in 2008, running 5 races with a best finish of 27th at Atlanta Motor Speedway. In 2009, he ran 15 Truck races for his own team, finishing a career high 22nd at Lowe's Motor Speedway. 

For 2010, Raymer picked up sponsorship from Ford to run the full season. After failing to qualify for the season opener at Daytona, the beginning of Raymer's season was filled with adversity. After losing the last of their race-ready trucks in fiery wrecks during the Charlotte Motor Speedway race weekend, the team was forced to start and park for the next two months. Raymer returned to full competition for the inaugural race at Pocono Raceway, earning a career-best finish of 16th. He earned three more top-20 finishes over the rest of the season, finishing 19th in the final points standings.

In 2011, Raymer ran only five races and finish 53rd in points in Camping World Truck Series. He ran in only one race in 2012 and came 71st in points. Since then, he founded the CrossFit Afton fitness center in Concord, North Carolina.

Motorsports career results

NASCAR
(key) (Bold – Pole position awarded by qualifying time. Italics – Pole position earned by points standings or practice time. * – Most laps led.)

Camping World Truck Series

References

External links
 
 

Living people
1985 births
People from Concord, North Carolina
Racing drivers from Charlotte, North Carolina
Racing drivers from North Carolina
NASCAR drivers